Eaves is a hamlet in Lancashire, England, six miles north of Preston. It is part of the Fylde, a flat area of land between the Forest of Bowland and the Lancashire coast. The village has a school, St. Mary and St. Andrew's Catholic Primary School, and a pub, the Plough at Eaves, which is the oldest in the Fylde. It was originally called the Cheadle Plough Inn.

Eaves is in the parish of Woodplumpton.

See also

Listed buildings in Woodplumpton

References

External links

Villages in Lancashire
Geography of the City of Preston
The Fylde